The Scourge is a 1922 British silent drama film directed by Geoffrey Malins and starring Madge Stuart, Joseph R. Tozer and William Stack. It is based on the novel Fortune's Fool by Rafael Sabatini, who also wrote the screenplay. It was made at Isleworth Studios for release by Stoll Pictures, the largest British film company of the era.

Cast
 Madge Stuart as Sylvia Farquharson  
 Joseph R. Tozer as Duke of Buckingham  
 William Stack as Ned Holles  
 Simeon Stuart as General Monk  
 A. Harding Steerman as Rev. Sylvester  
 Ruth Mackay as Mrs. Quin  
 Frank Woolf as Tucker 
 Fothringham Lysons as Bates

References

Bibliography
 Goble, Alan. The Complete Index to Literary Sources in Film. Walter de Gruyter, 1999.
 Low, Rachael. The History of the British Film 1918-1929. George Allen & Unwin, 1971.

External links
 

1922 films
1922 drama films
British drama films
British silent feature films
Films directed by Geoffrey Malins
Films based on British novels
Films shot at Isleworth Studios
British black-and-white films
1920s English-language films
1920s British films
Silent drama films